Samuel Doria Medina Auza (born 4 December 1958) is a politician in Bolivia and former business person. From 1987 until 2014 he was the President and main shareholder in SOBOCE. SOBOCE is the largest cement manufacturer in Bolivia.
He is the leader of the National Unity Front and represented the party alongside Carlos Fernando Dabdoub Arrien in the December 2005 Presidential Elections. In that election, Doria Medina finished 3rd with 7.8% of the national vote. He ran again in the 2009 elections and won 5.65% of the vote. Doria Medina ran once again in the 2014 elections; coming out second with 25.1 of the vote.

He has sought to position himself and his party as a moderate third force in Bolivian politics.

References

1958 births
Living people
20th-century Bolivian politicians
21st-century Bolivian politicians
Alumni of the London School of Economics
Bolivian businesspeople
Bolivian economists
Candidates in the 2005 Bolivian presidential election
Candidates in the 2009 Bolivian presidential election
Candidates in the 2014 Bolivian presidential election
Government ministers of Bolivia
National Unity Front politicians
People from La Paz
Revolutionary Left Movement (Bolivia) politicians
Victims of aviation accidents or incidents in Bolivia